The 2002 Coupe de France Final was a football match held at Stade de France, Saint-Denis on 11 May 2002, that saw FC Lorient defeat SC Bastia 1–0 thanks to a goal by Jean-Claude Darcheville. The final is also famous for a post-game prank by Rémi Gaillard.

Route to the final

Match details

See also
2001–02 Coupe de France

External links
Coupe de France results at Rec.Sport.Soccer Statistics Foundation
Report on French federation site

Final
2002
Coupe De France Final 2002
Coupe De France Final 2002
Coupe de France Final
Sport in Saint-Denis, Seine-Saint-Denis
Coupe de France Final